The Clan Pt. 2.5: The Final Chapter is the debut studio album and the final part of The Clan series by the South Korean boy group Monsta X. It was released by Starship Entertainment and distributed by LOEN Entertainment on March 21, 2017. It also includes ten songs, with the title track "Beautiful". On the same year, the album was re-released under the title Shine Forever on June 19, with two additional tracks, including the title track of the same name.

Background and release
On March 5, it was confirmed that the group will release their first full album and the third part of The Clan series titled The Clan Pt. 2.5: The Final Chapter, after releasing the first two parts of The Clan series and both extended plays; The Clan Pt. 1 Lost in May 2016 and The Clan Pt. 2 Guilty in October 2016.

On March 21, the title track "Beautiful" was released along with the full album. The music video for the title track was also released on Starship's and 1theK's official YouTube channels on the same day.

On June 5, Monsta X announced the release of the first regular repackage album through the official SNS. The image posted with the phrase "Repackage Coming Soon!" catches the eye with dreamy colors and sensual typography.

On June 19, the title track "Shine Forever" was released along with the full album. The music video for the title track was also released on Starship's and 1theK's official YouTube channels on the same day.

The initial physical album was released in three versions; Beautiful, Brilliant, and Beside, while its repackaged was released in two versions; Shine Forever and Complete X-Clan.

Composition
The album showed a strong step to protect the beauty of the found value, representing the souls that were hurt, and keeping the pure values, while bearing fruits of growth, while the repackage album is about searching for a ray of hope, like a traveler who finds his way by relying on the polar star shining alone in the dark night sky, and never gives up the hope of finding the light even if it gets lost, while having the desire for endless learning and growth.

"Beautiful" is a song in which the trap and dubstep sounds combine to create a popular melody line, expressing the love that one cannot have through a red rose and the heart for a love, that is difficult to deny. "Shine Forever" is a dance song that combines future bass and hip-hop elements, that expresses their strong and romantic love method, while having the growth to move toward the light, that begins with a tragic end and becomes more intense towards the end, burning the will to grow.

Critical reception
"Beautiful" was described as advancing Monsta X's "signature sound of hip-hop mixed with EDM elements", with particular note of the "powerful rap" with "flawless vocals, especially lead vocalist Kihyun".

Listicles

Commercial performance
As of 2021, the album had sold over 150,000 units, while in 2022, the repackage album had sold over 80,000 units in South Korea.

"Beautiful" and "Shine Forever" debuted at numbers four, alongside "Gravity" at number seven on the Billboard World Digital Song Sales chart upon its release, while "Ready or Not" debuted at number nineteen in 2021.

Track listing

Charts

Album

The Clan Pt. 2.5: The Final Chapter

Weekly charts

Monthly chart

Year-end chart

Shine Forever

Weekly charts

Monthly chart

Year-end chart

Songs

Weekly chart

Sales

The Clan Pt. 2.5: The Final Chapter

Shine Forever

Awards and nominations

Release history

See also
 List of K-pop songs on the Billboard charts
 List of K-pop albums on the Billboard charts
 List of K-pop songs on the World Digital Song Sales chart
 List of Gaon Album Chart number ones of 2017

References

2017 albums
Korean-language albums
Kakao M albums
Monsta X albums
Starship Entertainment albums